Certifiable: Live in Buenos Aires is a live album and concert video by the Police. It was recorded in December 2007 during the band's reunion tour and was released in November 2008. The album was released in the US exclusively through Best Buy. The album has a number of releases including a four disc version containing two CDs and two DVDs. The two CDs contain the live album from River Plate Stadium in Buenos Aires, Argentina. The first DVD contains the 109-minute wide-screen concert presented in Dolby Surround and Stereo. The concert film was directed and produced by Jim Gable and Ann Kim, of Graying & Balding, Inc. The second DVD contains the 50-minute bonus feature, "Better Than Therapy," directed by Stewart Copeland's son Jordan Copeland, detailing The Police's reunion with behind-the-scenes interviews from the band and road crew, plus two photo galleries of The Police on tour: one shot by guitarist and photographer Andy Summers, and one by photographer Danny Clinch. The DVDs were also released on Blu-ray format. A triple vinyl format was also released that contained a digital download of the concert.

Track listing US (UK deluxe) format
All tracks written by Sting, except for "Reggatta de Blanc" by Stewart Copeland/Andy Summers/Sting.

CD 1
"Message in a Bottle"
"Synchronicity II"
"Walking on the Moon"
"Voices Inside My Head" / "When the World Is Running Down, You Make the Best of What's Still Around"
"Don't Stand So Close to Me"
"Driven to Tears"
"Hole in My Life"
"Truth Hits Everybody"
"Every Little Thing She Does Is Magic"
"Wrapped Around Your Finger"

CD 2
"De Do Do Do, De Da Da Da"
"Invisible Sun"
"Walking in Your Footsteps"
"Can't Stand Losing You" / "Reggatta de Blanc"
"Roxanne"
"King of Pain"
"So Lonely"
"Every Breath You Take"
"Next to You"

DVD 1
Live from Buenos Aires (same track listing as both CDs)

DVD 2
Better Than Therapy – 50 min. documentary
Two photo galleries, one by Andy Summers and one by Danny Clinch

Blu-ray edition

Blu-ray Disc
Same as both DVDs

CDs
Same as above

UK (International) standard format

DVD
Live from Buenos Aires (same as deluxe edition)

CD
"Message in a Bottle"
"Synchronicity II"
"Walking on the Moon"
"Don't Stand So Close To Me"
"Driven to Tears"
"Every Little Thing She Does Is Magic"
"De Do Do Do, De Da Da Da"
"Walking in Your Footsteps"
"Can't Stand Losing You"/"Reggatta de Blanc"
"Roxanne"
"King of Pain"
"So Lonely"
"Every Breath You Take"
"Next to You"

Personnel
The Police
Sting – bass guitar, lead vocals
Andy Summers – guitars, guitars synthesizers, keyboards, backing vocals
Stewart Copeland – drums, percussion, xylophone, backing vocals

Charts

Certifications

References

The Police live albums
2008 video albums
Live video albums
2008 live albums
A&M Records live albums
A&M Records video albums
Universal Records live albums
Universal Records video albums
Live new wave albums
Live albums recorded in Buenos Aires
Concert films